St Barbara's Church can refer to any one of the many churches dedicated to Saint Barbara:

Anglican

United Kingdom
St Barbara's Church, Ashton under Hill
St Barbara's Church, Earlsdon
St Barbara's Church, Haceby

Coptic Orthodox

Egypt
Saint Barbara Church in Coptic Cairo

Roman Catholic

Andorra
Església de Santa Bàrbara d'Ordino

Czech Republic
St. Barbara's Church, Kutná Hora

Ghana
St. Barbara Catholic Church

Italy
Basilica palatina di Santa Barbara, Mantua
Santa Barbara dei Librai, Rome
Santa Barbara, Turin

Malta
Church of Saint Barbara, Valletta

Mexico
Iglesia de Santa Bárbara (Santa Rosalía)

Namibia
St. Barbara Catholic Church (Namibia)

Philippines
Santa Barbara Church, Santa Barbara, Iloilo

Poland
St. Barbara's Church, Warsaw

Portugal
Church of Santa Bárbara (Vila do Porto)
Church of Santa Bárbara (Horta)

Spain
Santa Bárbara, Madrid

Ukraine
St. Barbara's Church, Berdychiv

United States
Mission Santa Barbara
St. Barbara's Church (Brooklyn), New York
St. Barbara Church (Chicago)